The Robert Award for Best Documentary Feature is one of the merit awards presented by the Danish Film Academy at the annual Robert Awards ceremony. The award has been handed out since 2002.

Honorees

2000s 
 2002:  by Sami Saif & 
 2003:  by Camilla Hjelm Knudsen & Martin Zandvliet
 2004:  by Morten Henriksen & 
 2005:  by Jeppe Rønde
 2006:  by Ove Nyholm
 2007:  by 
 2008: Milosevic on Trial by Michael Christoffersen
 2009: Burma VJ by

2010s 
 2010:  by 
 2011: Armadillo by Janus Metz Pedersen
 2012: The Ambassador by Mads Brügger
 2013: The Act of Killing by Joshua Oppenheimer
 2014:  by Mira Jargil
 2015: The Look of Silence by Joshua Oppenheimer
 2016: The Man Who Saved the World by Peter Anthony
 2017:  by Sine Skibsholt
 2018: Last Men in Aleppo by Feras Fayyad
 2019:  by

See also 

 Robert Award for Best Documentary Short
 Bodil Award for Best Documentary

References

External links 
  

2002 establishments in Denmark
Awards established in 2002
Awards for best film
Documentary Feature